The Oath and the Man is a 1910 American film directed by D. W. Griffith.

Plot summary

Cast 
Henry B. Walthall as Henri Prevost
Florence Barker as Madame Prevost
W. Chrystie Miller as A Priest
Francis J. Grandon as A Nobleman

Soundtrack

External links 

1910 films
1910 drama films
American silent short films
1910s English-language films
American black-and-white films
Silent American drama films
1910 short films
Films directed by D. W. Griffith
1910s American films